Budget Rent a Car is an American car rental company that was founded in 1958 in Los Angeles, California by Morris Mirkin. Budget is a subsidiary of the Avis Budget Group, with its operations headquartered in Parsippany, New Jersey.

History 
With its original fleet of 10 cars, the company lived up to the 'Budget' name by undercutting the daily and per mile rental rates of the established airport based car rental companies. Mirkin was joined in 1959 by Julius Lederer and together, they built the company internationally. In 1960, the headquarters moved to Chicago, Illinois and the rental fleet expanded with franchised and wholly owned rental outlets.

The company was eventually acquired by Transamerica Corporation, and then sold in 1986 in a leveraged buyout by Gibbons, Green and van Amerongen Ltd., along with management (led by CEO Clifton E. Haley) and selected investors. The company made its first public stock offering in 1987.

Team Rental Group purchased the public company in 1997 and took the name Budget Group. In 2002, it sold the company's assets to Cendant Corporation, which also owned Avis. In September 2006, Cendant Corporation separated into four independent companies.  The real estate division became Realogy, Inc., its hospitality services division became Wyndham Worldwide, and the travel distribution services division became Travelport, Inc., an affiliate of The Blackstone Group.  In 2006, following the Travelport sale, Cendant, now composed solely of its vehicle rental services businesses, renamed itself Avis Budget Group.

Locations 
Worldwide, as of 2019, 2,275 locations are company owned, and 1,650 are licensees; 1,925 offices are located in the Americas, and 2,000 are located internationally.

Celebrity spokespersons 
Beginning in April 2011, television actress Wendie Malick of Hot in Cleveland became the spokesperson in a series of television and online ads that offer special, limited-time, discount offers.

See also 
Bob Ansett – Budget Australia's owner

References

External links 

 

1958 establishments in California
1980s initial public offerings
2002 mergers and acquisitions
American companies established in 1958
Avis Budget Group
Car rental companies of the United States
Franchises
Parsippany-Troy Hills, New Jersey
Retail companies established in 1958
Transport companies established in 1958